NBL may refer to:

Business 
 Namibia Breweries Limited
 National Bank Limited, the first private sector bank fully owned by Bangladeshi entrepreneurs
 Nepal Bank Limited
 Noble Energy, a former oil and natural gas exploration and production company with the NYSE ticker symbol NBL, now part of Chevron Corporation
 North British Locomotive Company

Science 
 n-Butyllithium, an organic compound
 Neutral Buoyancy Laboratory, an astronaut training facility at NASA's Johnson Space Center
 New Brunswick Laboratory

Sports 
 National Badminton League (United Kingdom)
 National Basketball League (disambiguation)
 National Bicycle League (United States)
 National Bowling League (United States) – defunct
 North Bay League, now part of the North Coast Section (NCS) of the California Interscholastic Federation (CIF)

Other uses 
 North Berwick Law, a volcanic plug in East Lothian, Scotland, United Kingdom
 Northumberland, county in England, Chapman code
 Nuestra Belleza Latina, a reality television beauty pageant